The International Baptist Convention is an association of English-speaking Baptist churches and missions in Africa, Europe and the Middle East.
It is affiliated with the Baptist World Alliance. The headquarters is in Frankfurt.

History
The International Baptist Convention has its roots in the Association of Baptists in Continental Europe founded in 1959 by Immanuel Baptist Church in Wiesbaden and Bethel International Baptist Church in Frankfurt, Germany. Beginning in 1961, the International Mission Board sent a missionary couple to work with these churches. Some churches from England joined the ABCE in 1964, and the name was changed to the European Baptist Convention (EBC). The first EBC churches were started to minister to United States military personnel stationed in Europe. In 2003, the name was changed to International Baptist Convention after the body expanded outside Europe. According to a denomination census released in 2020, it claimed 65 churches and 5,005 members.

Beliefs 
The convention has a Baptist confession of faith. It is a member of the Baptist World Alliance.

See also
 Baptists in Germany
 Born again
 Baptist beliefs
 Believers' Church

References

Sources
International Baptist Convention Constitution
International Baptist Convention Operations Manual

External links
International Baptist Convention Web Site
International Baptist Church Ministries Web Site

Christian organizations established in 1959
Baptist denominations in Europe
Baptist denominations established in the 20th century